Farzana Chobi, also known as “Farzana Chhoby” of “Chobi”, is a Bangladeshi actress, model who has appeared mainly in Bengali Drama, films and Documentary. For her role in her drama Shimana Periye (2013), she received the Meril-Prothom Alo Critics Choice Award for Best TV Actress-2013. Her notable works include Taan (2022), Vober Hat (2006) and Pakhi Ebong Manushera (2013).

Early life

Career 
Farzana Chobi made her acting debut in 1998 with Abdullah Al Mamun's ''Chithi''. Farzana was awarded the Merill-Prothom Alo Award in 2013 for best TV actor for her performance in the play 'Shimana Periye'  directed by Matia Banu Shuku.

Films

Television

Awards 

 Meril-Prothom Alo Critics Choice Award for Best TV Actress-2013

References

External links 
 

Best Film Actress Meril-Prothom Alo Award winners
Living people
Bengali television actresses
Bangladeshi film actresses
Year of birth missing (living people)